

403001–403100 

|-bgcolor=#f2f2f2
| colspan=4 align=center | 
|}

403101–403200 

|-bgcolor=#f2f2f2
| colspan=4 align=center | 
|}

403201–403300 

|-bgcolor=#f2f2f2
| colspan=4 align=center | 
|}

403301–403400 

|-bgcolor=#f2f2f2
| colspan=4 align=center | 
|}

403401–403500 

|-bgcolor=#f2f2f2
| colspan=4 align=center | 
|}

403501–403600 

|-id=563
| 403563 Ledbetter ||  || Lilly Ledbetter (born 1938) is an American who fights for pay equity. Upon discovering she was being paid less than her male colleagues, she sued her employer (Goodyear). Her case inspired passage of the Lilly Ledbetter Fair Pay Act in 2009. || 
|}

403601–403700 

|-bgcolor=#f2f2f2
| colspan=4 align=center | 
|}

403701–403800 

|-bgcolor=#f2f2f2
| colspan=4 align=center | 
|}

403801–403900 

|-bgcolor=#f2f2f2
| colspan=4 align=center | 
|}

403901–404000 

|-bgcolor=#f2f2f2
| colspan=4 align=center | 
|}

References 

403001-404000